Gabriel Trifu (born 14 April 1975) is a former Romanian tennis player. He won one ATP doubles title, in Bucharest in 1998, with fellow Romanian Andrei Pavel. Currently Romanian Davis Cup captain.

ATP career finals

Doubles: 1 (1 title)

ATP Challenger and ITF Futures finals

Singles: 4 (1–3)

Doubles: 20 (13–7)

Performance timelines

Singles

Doubles

References

External links
 
 
 
 
 
 

1975 births
Living people
Romanian male tennis players